Agustín Omar Bellone (born 2 February 1993) is an Argentine professional footballer who plays as a defender for Atlético Güemes.

Career
Bellone got his senior career underway with Colón. He didn't feature competitively for the club, though was an unused substitute for a Primera División fixture against Racing Club on 8 February 2014. In the succeeding June, Bellone moved to Torneo Federal A's Juventud Antoniana. His senior bow arrived on 29 August versus Central Córdoba. His first goal came in 2015 during a draw with Altos Hornos Zapla. Bellone joined Gimnasia y Tiro the following year, but missed the 2016 campaign after suffering a serious kidney injury, which put him into intensive care and threatened his career, on his Copa Argentina bow on 31 January.

A return to Juventud Antoniana for Bellone was confirmed on 21 July 2017, though he was on the move once again eleven months later after agreeing terms with Villa Dálmine of Primera B Nacional on 18 June 2018. His first appearance was in a 2–1 defeat away to Independiente Rivadavia on 7 October.

Personal life
Bellone is the brother of professional footballer Mauro Bellone, while Lucas Acosta is his brother-in-law.

Career statistics
.

References

External links

1993 births
Living people
People from San Cristóbal Department
Argentine footballers
Association football defenders
Torneo Federal A players
Primera Nacional players
Club Atlético Colón footballers
Juventud Antoniana footballers
Gimnasia y Tiro footballers
Villa Dálmine footballers
Crucero del Norte footballers
Olimpo footballers
Sportspeople from Santa Fe Province